Haeska is a village in Haapsalu urban municipality, Lääne County, in western Estonia, on the northern coast of the Matsalu Bay (part of the Väinameri). The southern part of the village is covered by the Matsalu National Park.

The islet of Suurrahu belongs to Haeska village.

References

 

Villages in Lääne County
Kreis Wiek